This is a list of law schools in Connecticut, arranged in alphabetical order.

References

External links
U.S. News & World Report Ranking of Law Schools

 
Connecticut